Adam Mikhaylovich Kurak (born 26 June 1985 in Yeniseysk) is a Russian Greco-Roman wrestler. He won a gold medal at the national championships in 2009, a silver medal in 2010 and bronze medals in 2011 and 2012. In 2013, he won a silver medal of the 2013 European Wrestling Championships. In 2014 at the Ivan Poddubny Golden Grand Prix won gold medal. Kurak won his first medal at a worlds at the 2015 World Wrestling Championships, where he lost to Rasul Chunayev but got back and won a bronze medal defeating Tsimur Berdyieu of Belarus.  Kurak avenged his 2015 World Wrestling Championships loss to Chunayev, by defeating him in the 2018 European Wrestling Championships and ultimately won the gold medal in the final match of the category.

Kurak is international master of sports in Greco-Roman Wrestling

References

External links
 
 Adam Kurak at the Russia Sport Wrestling Federation

1985 births
Living people
Russian male sport wrestlers
World Wrestling Championships medalists
European Wrestling Championships medalists
Sportspeople from Krasnoyarsk Krai
20th-century Russian people
21st-century Russian people